Santa María del Oro  is a city and seat of the municipality of El Oro, in the state of Durango, Mexico. As of 2010, the city had a population of 5,878. Many Duranguense groups were born here either members of the band or the band as a whole like Alacranes Musical and Conjunto Atardecer.

References

Populated places in Durango